Paul Steffen (17 January 1930 – 27 January 2017) was a Luxembourgian footballer. He played in 32 matches for the Luxembourg national football team from 1953 to 1962. He was also part of Luxembourg's squad for the football tournament at the 1948 Summer Olympics, but he did not play in any matches.

References

External links
 
 
 

1930 births
2017 deaths
Luxembourgian footballers
Luxembourg international footballers
Association football goalkeepers
Jeunesse Esch players